2012–13 season of Argentine football is the 122nd season of competitive football in Argentina.

National teams

Men's
This section covers Argentina men's matches from August 1, 2012 to July 31, 2013.

Friendlies

2014 World Cup qualifiers

References

External links
AFA
Argentina on FIFA.com
Soloascenso.com.ar

 
Seasons in Argentine football